Michael Richard Locke (born 13 March 1979), better known as Pancho, is a Welsh professional stuntman and a member of the Dirty Sanchez crew.

Locke starred in the film Dirty Sanchez: The Movie, released in 2006. He also appeared in the Channel 4 series Balls of Steel as one half of the "Pain Men", alongside Sanchez crew member Mathew Pritchard.

Filmography

Films

Television

Web series

Music videos

References

External links 

1979 births
People from Neath
British stunt performers
Welsh male comedians
Welsh skateboarders
Living people